Jack Mason Carlisle (September 23, 1929 – July 27, 2021) was an American football coach. He served as the head football coach at East Tennessee State University in Johnson City, Tennessee from 1978 to 1982, compiling a record of 21–34.

As a high school football coach at Lula–Rich High School in Mississippi, he coached Thomas Harris who later wrote the novel, The Silence of the Lambs.

Carlisle only had one leg due to an accident when he was 18 years old. He died on July 27, 2021, at his home in New Albany, Mississippi.

Head coaching record

College

References

1929 births
2021 deaths
American amputees
East Tennessee State Buccaneers football coaches
Ole Miss Rebels football coaches
High school football coaches in Mississippi
High school football coaches in Tennessee
Junior college football coaches in the United States
People from New Albany, Mississippi